The Chicken is a popular rhythm and blues dance that started in America in the 1950s, in which the dancers flapped their arms and kicked back their feet in an imitation of a chicken.  The dance featured lateral body movements.  It was used primarily as a change of pace step while doing the twist. The chicken dance gained popularity when Rufus Thomas wrote "Do the Funky Chicken", a hit record in 1970.

Legacy
In the 1960s the Chicken gave rise to The Frug, showcased in Bob Fosse's choreography.

It is featured in the 1980s original Blues Brothers musical comedy film directed by John Landis and starring John Belushi and Dan Aykroyd.

It is mentioned in 1997 Chicago Tribune column "Advice, like youth, probably just wasted on the young" by Mary Schmich, and in 1999 was made into a well-known song by Baz Luhrmann titled "Wear Sunscreen".

References

Dances of the United States
1950s in the United States
Chickens in popular culture